The women's 300 metres time trial event at the 2017 Summer Universiade was held on 21 August at the Yingfeng Riverside Park Roller Sports Rink (A).

Record

Results

Preliminary Round

Final

References 

Roller sports at the 2017 Summer Universiade